Aegiphila mollis (syn. Aegiphila salutaris) is a species of flowering plant in the family Lamiaceae. It is native to Central and South America. Its common names include contra culebra and totumillo.

This plant is a tree or shrub.

The species is cited in Flora Brasiliensis by Carl Friedrich Philipp von Martius.

References

External links
 Aegiphila salutaris. Flora Brasiliensis.

mollis